Craig Mitchell (born April 22, 1964 in Hempstead, NY) is an American character actor and comedian.
On stage he has appeared in over 40 productions. As a stand-up comedian, he toured for 15 years (1987–2001) and gained respect as solid performer on the eastern comedy circuit. In 1994, he co-founded the successful Long Island based improvisation group "The Comedy Express" (Originally named "The Online Comedy Express") which toured until 2003. In 2001, he moved from Long Island to Los Angeles to further pursue film and television projects. He most notably portrayed the title character in the award-winning 2004 dark comedy short film "The Lazy Assassin" directed by Jennifer Goyette. His most notable television appearances are The Ricki Lake Show, Boston Legal, The Sopranos and three appearances on Saturday Night Live.  In mid-2008, Craig wrote and appeared in the "Stakeout Trilogy". A series of three short comedy films showcased on YouTube.  On Film he has appeared in "Dozers" and in 2015 will be seen in "Give Til it Hurts" as Bob the dim-witted mechanic.  He has trained with Joan St. Onge, Stephen Strimpel, Ron House and Duane Whitaker and Daniel Roebuck.He currently resides in Van Nuys, CA.

External links
Personal site

1964 births
Living people
Male actors from New York (state)
American male film actors
People from Hempstead (village), New York